"On the 5:15" is a song written in 1914 by Henry I. Marshall and recorded in 1915 by Billy Murray, along with the American Quartet, which featured a bass counterpoint to Murray's Irish tenor voice (probably by William F. Hooley).

Content
The song is a satire of the commuter train system and the "modern" fast pace of life in the big cities, a situation already well-established by the time of World War I. "On the 5:15" has no chorus; each of its five stanzas is unique. It tells a tale of a frustrated commuter, one of many (as he soon discovers) who keep missing the 5:15 train to the suburbs, to the chagrin of their wives.

The first stanza:

The Ingersoll watch, made by the Ingersoll Watch Company, was a popular brand at that time due to its famous one-dollar price.

The subject of the song finally arrives home well after midnight, only to find the door locked and the lights out. He heads back to town instead, goes back to the office with an awful headache, then attempts to finally return home on the 5:15 -- only to discover that the train doesn't run on Saturdays. Eventually, he is taken to divorce court by his angry wife, only to win his case easily, as "the jury, the lawyers, the judge supreme / all are commuters on the 5:15".

One oddity about the song is the brief instrumental bar played at both the beginning and the end of the song: "Shave and a Haircut". First appearing as early as 1899, the tune was already well-known at the time.

The song's punch line is a common humorous or ironic gag. A modern example occurred when comedian Alan King told Johnny Carson about the time a particular airline had sued him for naming them on live TV after he experienced flight problems. He reported that the judge threw out the airline's case because the judge had also flown on that airline, with similar frustrating results.

Film 
The song was used in Other Men's Women, and sung a cappella by the railroad workers in the film.

See also
 "5:15", a train song by The Who
List of train songs

References

External links
Recording by Billy Murray and the American Quartet

1915 songs
Billy Murray (singer) songs